The Non-Fatal Offences against the Person Act 1997 is an Act of the Oireachtas which virtually codified the criminal law on offences against the person in the Republic of Ireland. The Act replaced the greater part of the Offences against the Person Act 1861, scrapping such concepts as actual bodily harm and grievous bodily harm, and recognised the use of modern technology as a weapon:

"force" includes...application of heat, light, electric current, noise or any other form of energy -Section 2.2(a)

The Act also made it an offence to use a syringe as a weapon, particularly where it is used to make the victim "...believe that he or she may become infected with disease".

See also
Offences Against the Person Act

References

External links 

 Irish Law Reform Commission. Report on Non-Fatal Offences Against the Person. 1994

1997 in Irish law
Acts of the Oireachtas of the 1990s
Offences against the person